Ashley Lemince (born April 8, 1987) is a Mauritian football player who currently plays for AS Port-Louis 2000 in the Mauritian Premier League and for the Mauritius national football team as a midfielder. He is featured on the Mauritian national team in the official 2010 FIFA World Cup video game.

References 

1987 births
Living people
Mauritius international footballers
Mauritian footballers
Mauritian Premier League players
Curepipe Starlight SC players
Association football midfielders